Four Girls From Hong Kong is a 1972 Hong Kong drama film directed by Lee Sun-fung.

Overview 
The film's Chinese title is 群芳譜. The film's alternative title is Kwan Fong Biu.

Cast 
 Chow Chung - Chang 
 Miu Kam-Fung 
 Tang Wen 
 Che Yue - Tang Pei-Hua 
 Cheng Chee-Liang 
 Willy Kong Tou 
 Yuet-ching Lee - Pei-Hua's mother 
 Leung Ming - Pei-Hua's father 
 Wang De-Jin - Blind father 
 Siu-Fong Lai

References

1972 films
Hong Kong drama films
1972 drama films
1970s Mandarin-language films
1970s Hong Kong films